Carlos Carrera (born 18 August 1962) is a Mexican film director and screenwriter. He directed El crimen del Padre Amaro (2002), which was nominated for the Academy Award for Best Foreign Language Film. In 2009, he directed Backyard about the female homicides in Ciudad Juárez, which won a silver plaque at the 2009 Chicago International Film Festival.

In 2008, Carrera was sponsor for Un aliado en el tiempo, a Sundance Film Festival official selection shortfilm.

Filmography

Film

Short films

References

External links

1962 births
Living people
Mexican screenwriters
Mexican people of Basque descent
Film directors from Mexico City
Best Director Ariel Award winners
Best Adapted Screenplay Ariel Award winners